Roope Salminen & Koirat is a Finnish band fronted by rapper and television personality Roope Salminen. Originally formed as a one-gig only cover band, they have since had success with original songs such as "Madafakin darra" and the parent album Madafakin levy, both of which reached number-one on the Official Finnish Charts.

Discography

Albums

Singles

References

External links
 

Finnish pop music groups
Musical groups established in 2010
2010 establishments in Finland